Whitchurch Rural District may refer to the following rural districts of England:

Whitchurch Rural District, Hampshire
Whitchurch Rural District, Herefordshire
Whitchurch Rural District, Shropshire